Wolffram’s Red Salt is an inorganic compound with the double salt formula [Pt(C2H5NH2)4Cl2][Pt(C2H5NH2)4]Cl4·4H2O. This compound is an early example of a one-dimensional coordination polymer, serving as a representative structure for studies in solid-state physics. This species has been of interest due to the unusual mixed valence system of Pt(II) and Pt(IV) bridged by a chlorine atom. The deep red color of the double salt, where the components were colorless, piqued the interest of early inorganic chemists and ultimately inspired studies into the physical properties of the compound in search of potential applications.

History
In 1850, Charles-Adolphe Wurtz described a colorless platinum tetrammine with the formula [Pt(etn)4]Cl2 2H2O; Wolffram (H. Wolffram, Dissertation, Königsberg, 1900.), whom the compound is named after, obtained a red salt from this by action of hydrogen peroxide in hydrochloric acid, and initially considered it to be isomeric with Wurtz’s salt. With no known case of plato-tetrammine isomerism at the time, this prompted extensive discussion in the literature of the true nature and properties of Wolffram’s Red Salt.

Preparation
Reihlen and Flohr demonstrated that Wolffram’s salt could be prepared directly by mixing aqueous solutions of the colorless [Pt(etn)4]Cl2 and its yellow analogue, [Pt(etn)4Cl2]Cl2, where etn = NH2CH2CH3, leading to the most probable conclusion of the double salt formula, [Pt(C2H5NH2)4Cl2][Pt(C2H5NH2)4]Cl4·4H2O, compared with concurrently postulated explanations of tervalent platinum.

Studies
Early explanations for the deep red color of the salt were attributed to the special structure of the crystal lattice, albeit with little explanation. While Drew & Tess attempted to explain the deep color of this compound based on the assumption of a Pt(III) species, Jensen established the diamagnetism of the compound and proved that it did not involve Pt(III). Spectrochemical studies on the compound crystals concluded that the deep color of Wolffram’s salt crystals is due to the stacking of the “infinite chains” - linear Pt(II)/Pt(IV) stacked on top of each other.
In 1960, the crystal structure was shown to be consistent with the formulated double salt, inspiring examinations of other analogues to compare and better understand this unique coordination pattern.
Solid-state physical examinations were conducted to further elucidate the charge transfer across the mixed valence chain and potentially find use as semiconductors. X-ray scattering studies were performed, explicitly showing the mixed valence chain structure. Optical properties were probed, as well as potential use as a photocatalyst, albeit with disappointing results.

References

Platinum compounds
Inorganic compounds
Chlorides
Metal halides
Chloro complexes
Mixed valence compounds